DF-25 (Dong Feng-25) was a Chinese two-stage, solid-propellant, road-mobile Intermediate-range ballistic missile (IRBM). Missilethreat.com stated it could deliver a single or multiple conventional warheads weighing  over a maximum distance of 3,200 km to 4,000 km.

There are conflicting reports on whether the DF-25 entered service, and if so, when. The Federation of American Scientists notes reports that China had abandoned development of the DF-25 in 1996. The U.S. Department of Defense in its 2013 report to Congress on China's military developments made no mention of the DF-25 as a missile in service.

References

Weapons of the People's Republic of China
Intermediate-range ballistic missiles
Ballistic missiles of the People's Republic of China